Marxistisk-Leninistisk Forbund (Marxist-Leninist League), a marxist-leninist group in Denmark 1976-1978. MLF was an Odense-based group that was expelled from Kommunistisk Arbejderparti (Communist Workers Party) in 1976, after having criticized the class analysis and problems of internal democracy of KAP.

MLF denounced the Three Worlds Theory propagated by the Communist Party of China.

On December 31, 1978 MLF merged with Kommunistisk Sammenslutning (marxister-leninister) (Communist Union (Marxist-Leninist)) to form Danmarks Kommunistiske Parti/Marxister-Leninister (Communist Party of Denmark/Marxist-Leninist).

References

Defunct communist parties in Denmark
Political parties established in 1976
Political parties disestablished in 1978
1976 establishments in Denmark
1978 disestablishments in Denmark